The discography of American country music artist Cam contains three studio albums, one extended play, nine singles, five music videos, four promotional singles and three additional album appearances. Under her birth name, "Camaron Ochs", she released her debut studio album, Heartforward, in 2010. Shortening her professional name to "Cam", she released an independent single in 2013 titled "Down This Road". The song helped her sign her first recording contract with Arista Records in 2015. Along with the single, "My Mistake", Cam issued the extended play Welcome to Cam Country in early 2015. Among other peak positions, the extended play reached number 31 on the Billboard Top Country Albums chart.

It was her next single, "Burning House", that became Cam's first major hit. The single peaked in the top five of the Billboard Hot Country Songs chart and Country Airplay chart. In December 2015, Cam's second studio album was released. Entitled Untamed, the album peaked at number 2 on the Billboard country albums chart and number 12 on the Billboard 200 list.

In 2016, "Mayday" was spawned as the second single from Cam's 2015 studio album. Her next single release was 2017's "Diane". The song reached minor positions on the Billboard charts, reaching number 43 on the country songs list. Departing from the Arista label, Cam switched to a new record label in 2018. Her first release with a new label would be "Road to Happiness". In 2020 she released the single, "Till There's Nothing Left".

Albums

Studio albums

Extended plays

Singles

As lead artist

As featured artist

Promotional singles

Music videos

Other appearances

References

Discographies of American artists
Country music discographies